Wayne Kemp (June 11, 1940 – March 9, 2015) was an American country music singer/songwriter. He recorded between 1964 and 1986 for JAB Records, Decca, MCA, United Artists, Mercury and Door Knob Records, and charted twenty-four singles on the Hot Country Songs charts. His highest-peaking single was "Honky Tonk Wine," which peaked at No. 17 in 1973. The song is included on his second studio album, Kentucky Sunshine, which reached No. 25 on Top Country Albums.

Kemp was born, one of nine children, to a musical family in Greenwood, Arkansas. His parents played several instruments and encouraged their children to sing and harmonize together. When Wayne was six, the family moved to Muldrow, Oklahoma, and soon he was performing in church and at local events. By the age of 16, he was writing songs and playing guitar professionally with Tulsa country star Benny Ketchum.

Kemp's first break came in 1965, when a friend passed his demo tape to George Jones. The singer liked the guitar playing and two of Kemp's songs, "Love Bug"  and "I Made Her That Way," and recorded them. Soon, Kemp found himself in Nashville, recording with Jones and making his own solo record.

But just as his star was on the rise, tragedy struck. En route to a gig, a drunk driver crashed into the car that was carrying Kemp and his band. The car burst into flames. Two of Kemp's band-mates were killed, and Wayne suffered third degree burns on his face, hands and legs. Wayne's doctors told him he would never again be able to play guitar.

But, with hard work and determination, Kemp proved them wrong. In 1968, he had his first #1, "Next In Line" by Conway Twitty, quickly followed by Twitty's hits with “The Image Of Me”, "Darling, You Know I Wouldn't Lie" and "That's When She Started To Stop Loving You." Kemp signed as a staff writer with Tree International and hit the road, playing guitar with Conway Twitty's band. His own solo recording career began the year after, with hits like "Won't You Come Home (And Talk To A Stranger)", "Bar Room Habits", and “I’ll Leave This World Loving You.”

For the next two decades, Kemp pursued his solo career while writing for others and earning a reputation as a master of the country & western heartbreak song. Kemp achieved significant success writing songs for Johnny Cash (i.e., the #1 country hit "One Piece At A Time"), George Strait (“The Fireman”), Johnny Paycheck (“The Only Hell My Mama Ever Raised”), Hank Williams Jr., Ronnie Milsap, Jack Greene, Faron Young, Mickey Gilley, Charley Pride, Tom Petty, and Willie Nelson. Ricky Van Shelton scored a #1 country hit when he released a cover of Kemp's "I'll Leave This World Loving You" and Emmylou Harris's cover of "Feelin' Single - Seein' Double" became one of her signature songs.

Wayne Kemp was inducted into the Nashville Songwriters Hall of Fame in 1999.

Kemp died at the age of 74, on 9 March 2015, in Macon County General Hospital, Lafayette, Tennessee.  He was suffering from multiple ailments and was on kidney dialysis when he died.

Discography

Albums

Singles

References

External links
 

1940 births
2015 deaths
People from Greenwood, Arkansas
American country guitarists
American male guitarists
American country singer-songwriters
People from Muldrow, Oklahoma
MCA Records artists
Mercury Records artists
Singer-songwriters from Arkansas
United Artists Records artists
Guitarists from Arkansas
20th-century American guitarists
Country musicians from Oklahoma
Country musicians from Arkansas
20th-century American male musicians
American male singer-songwriters
Singer-songwriters from Oklahoma